Arizzano is a comune (municipality) in the Province of Verbano-Cusio-Ossola in the Italian region Piedmont, located about  northeast of Turin and about  northeast of Verbania.

Arizzano borders the following municipalities: Bee, Ghiffa, Verbania, Vignone.

References

External links
Official website

Cities and towns in Piedmont
Articles which contain graphical timelines